Mopothila is a monotypic moth genus of the family Erebidae described by Nye in 1975. Its only species, Mopothila ardalus, was first described by Herbert Druce in 1891. It is found in Panama.

References

Calpinae
Monotypic moth genera